Stephen Turner may refer to:

 Stephen Park Turner (born 1951), educationist
 Stephen Barker Turner (born 1968), actor
 Stephen Turner (rower) (born 1964), British Olympic rower

See also 
 Stephen Turner House, historic house in Norfolk, Massachusetts
 Steven Turner (born 1987), Canadian football player
 Steve Turner (disambiguation)